Flame of Passion is a 1915 American silent film directed by Tom Terriss. The film was produced by Terriss Feature Film Company and released on 11 October 2015 in the United States.

Cast
 Tom Terriss as Dick Lorient
 Ellaline Terriss as Vampire Woman
 Rienzi De Cordova as John Stark
 Marguerite Hanley as Dulcie Lanyon

References

1915 films
American silent feature films
Films directed by Tom Terriss
1910s American films